Leandro Xavier Marques Silva (born 27 July 1995) is a Portuguese professional footballer who plays for Mafra as a defender.

Football career
He made his Taça da Liga debut for Oliveirense on 3 August 2019 in a game against Rio Ave.

On 12 June 2021, he signed with Mafra.

References

External links

1995 births
Living people
Sportspeople from Santa Maria da Feira
Portuguese footballers
Association football defenders
Liga Portugal 2 players
Campeonato de Portugal (league) players
Lusitano F.C. (Portugal) players
F.C. Felgueiras 1932 players
U.D. Oliveirense players
G.D. Gafanha players
C.D. Mafra players